Asiyab-e Mir Naser (also romanized as Āsīyāb-e Mīr Nāṣer; also known as Āsīyāb-e Nāṣer) is a village in Amjaz Rural District, in the Central District of Anbarabad County, Kerman Province, Iran. At the 2006 census, its population was 9, in 4 families.

References 

Populated places in Anbarabad County